The 2004–05 season was Dynamo Dresden's first in the 2. Bundesliga, a return to fully professional national football after a nine-year absence. They were in relegation contention for much of the first half of the season, but finished strongly to finish in eighth place.

Squad

Results

2. Bundesliga

DFB-Pokal

Transfers

External links
Season details at fussballdaten 

Dynamo Dresden seasons
Dynamo Dresden